Shqiprim Binakaj (born 26 April 1989) is an Kosovan professional footballer who plays as a midfielder for TSG Backnang 1919.

References

External links
Shqiprim Binakaj at FuPa

1989 births
Living people
German footballers
Kosovan footballers
Association football midfielders
Kosovan emigrants to Germany
Kosovan expatriates in Germany
SG Sonnenhof Großaspach players
3. Liga players
Regionalliga players
Sportspeople from Gjakova